P'tang, Yang, Kipperbang, also released as Kipperbang, is a British television film first shown on Channel 4 on its second night, 3 November 1982.

Written by Jack Rosenthal as part of the First Love series, it is a coming-of-age film set in a grammar school in the outer London suburbs of the late forties (1948). The film was directed by Michael Apted, known for the UK TV documentary series 7 Up.  It is the story of Alan Duckworth (John Albasiny), a young cricket-obsessed boy, and his first kiss with Ann Lawton (Abigail Cruttenden). Alan's thoughts are voiced by real life BBC Radio cricket commentator John Arlott in the style of a match commentary. The title phrase comes from a password used by members of Alan's gang.

Plot
Alan Duckworth (known as 'Quack Quack' to his friends) is a socially awkward fourteen-year-old who is obsessed with cricket and Ann Lawton, a girl in his class. Alan daydreams throughout his day (often with a voiceover by cricket commentator John Arlott), showing up late for school and making little academic progress.  He is friendly with the groundsman Tommy (Garry Cooper), whom he views as a hero, to Tommy's embarrassment. Alan often follows Tommy around, telling him how Tommy helped to win the war, while making predictions about what the post-war world will be like. Among other things, Alan predicts that there will be no more wars, everyone will speak Esperanto and everyone, regardless of race or creed, will have a teasmade.

Meanwhile, Miss Land (Alison Steadman) is worried she is pregnant with Tommy's baby, something that would result in her having to resign from her job as an English teacher. She is also dealing with her headmaster's interest in her, a hangover from an apparent affair during the war. When Miss Land and Tommy celebrate what turns out to be a false alarm, they realise they are attracted to each other after all. Later however, police show up at the school and Tommy finds himself under arrest. It is revealed that the stories he has told Alan about fighting at Dunkirk, El Alamein, the Battle of the Bulge and Burma are untrue: he deserted the war three weeks into his service.

While his friends are all interested in talking about sex, which Alan refers to as 'the other thing', he is privately obsessed about kissing Ann Lawton. Ann is not well regarded by Alan's friends, since she is very strait-laced. She also appears to be romantically interested in another boy. Alan sees a golden opportunity when Miss Land casts him and Ann together in a school play where in the final scene they have to kiss.

Cast
John Albasiny - Alan Duckworth
Abigail Cruttenden - Ann Lawton
Maurice Dee - Geoffrey Whitaker
Alison Steadman - Miss Land
Frances Ruffelle - Eunice
Robert Urquhart - Headmaster
Garry Cooper - Tommy
Mark Brailsford - Abbo
Chris Karallis - Shaz
Maurice O'Connell - Gym Teacher
Tim Seeley - French Master
Richenda Carey - Botany Teacher
Peter Dean - Police Officer
Eric Richard - Road Worker

Filming
Filming took place at Wimbledon Chase Primary School and in the surrounding area.

Box office
Goldcrest Films invested £378,000 in the film and received £749,000 earning them a profit of £371,000.

References

External links
 
 

1982 television films
1982 films
1982 romantic drama films
1980s teen drama films
British coming-of-age drama films
British romantic drama films
Channel 4
Films directed by Michael Apted
Films set in London
Films set in the 1950s
1980s teen romance films
1980s coming-of-age drama films
1980s English-language films
1980s British films
British drama television films